In 1992, Lepelletier proposed three degrees of freedom epicyclic gear mechanisms.  These are now called Lepelletier gear mechanisms.
The Lepelletier gearbox is constructed by connecting a planetary gear to a Ravigneaux gear.

References

Gears
Epicyclical gearing